Petras Mantigirdovich (died 1459) was an influential noble of the Grand Duchy of Lithuania. He was Grand Marshal of Lithuania (1434–59).

Mantigirdovich was one of the sons of Matigird, regent of Polotsk. He was first mentioned in the 1413 Union of Horodło where he received the Wadwicz coat of arms. In 1422–23 he was Grand Duke's marshal. Around 1424 he became regent of Podolia, but lost this post in 1426. He was regent of Navahrudak (1430–32 and 1445–56) and Polotsk (1459). He supported the 1432 coup against Švitrigaila and commanded troops of Sigismund Keystutovich in the Lithuanian Civil War (1431–35). He was also sent on several diplomatic missions: in 1430, 1432, 1448 to the Kingdom of Poland, in 1431 to the Golden Horde, in 1444 to the Teutonic Knights. 

Mantigirdovich was married twice. The name or origin of the first wife is unknown; they had one son Jan, who was not active in politics and possibly died young. His second wife was Anna, daughter of Feodor, son of Karibut and grandson of Grand Duke Olgerd. This marriage was childless. His main estate was in Iwye in present-day Grodno Region, Belarus (it was granted to him in 1434 by Sigismund Keystutovich, but it could have been a confirmation of his patrimonial rights). From his second mother-in-law he received Losk and was asked to take care of her other two daughters. Mantigirdovich had other landholdings near Šalčininkai and Ashmyany.

References

1459 deaths
15th-century Lithuanian nobility
Year of birth unknown
Grand Marshals of the Grand Duchy of Lithuania